Noailles is a commune in the Oise department in northern France.

International relations
Noailles has a partnership with Großenenglis in Germany since 1969.

See also
 Communes of the Oise department

References

Communes of Oise